Semiramide (RV 733) is a dramma per musica in three acts by Antonio Vivaldi composed to a libretto by .

It was his ultimate work at the archducal theatre in Mantua, where Vivaldi was maestro di cappella from 1718 until 1720. The production started the young castrato Mariano Nicolini in the role of Oronte as well as the famous "prima donna" Anna Girò in the role of Semiramide, with Maria Maddalena Pieri, famous for her breeches roles, as Nino. It was first performed during the carnival of 1732. Only the libretto and individual arias have survived.

The story of Semiramis was the subject of plays by Crébillon, Voltaire and Calderon de la Barca as well as of other operas by Porpora, Gluck, Rossini and dozens of other composers.

References

Operas by Antonio Vivaldi
1732 operas
Italian-language operas
Operas based on plays
Operas
Semiramis